Harndrup is a town located on the island of Funen in south Denmark, in Middelfart Municipality.

Sport
The town is located 3 kilometers north of Fjelsted, which includes the Speedway stadium known as the Fjelsted Speedway Stadium, which is the home of Fjelsted Speedway Klub who race in the Danish Speedway League.

References 

Cities and towns in the Region of Southern Denmark
Middelfart Municipality